Gagan Ajit Singh (born 9 December 1980) is an Indian former field hockey player who played as a forward. He was the captain of the India national under-21 team that won the 2001 Junior World Cup. He was a member of the Indian senior national team that played at two Olympic Games — 2000 Sydney and 2004 Athens.

Biography 
Gagan Ajit Singh was born on 9 December 1980 in Firozpur, a city in the Indian State of Punjab. His father Ajit Singh was also an Olympian and played for India at the 1976 Montreal  Olympics. His uncle is another Olympian Harmik Singh. Gagan Ajit was educated at the Union Academy Senior Secondary School and Jamia Millia Islamia in New Delhi.

Singh trained in hockey at the Government Arts and Sports College in Jalandhar in 1995. In 1997, he was selected by New Delhi's Air India Hockey Academy to compete in the junior national tournament. Singh scored 26 goals and emerged as the tournament's top-scorer. He captained the side in 1999.

Singh made his senior national debut in 1997 during a test series against Russia. Singh played at the 2000 and the 2004 Summer Olympics, where India finished in seventh place on both occasions. Singh was the top-scorer for India with seven goals in the latter competition.

References

External links
 
 
 Profile at bharatiyahockey.org

1980 births
Living people
Field hockey players at the 2000 Summer Olympics
Field hockey players at the 2004 Summer Olympics
Olympic field hockey players of India
Sportspeople from Firozpur
Jamia Millia Islamia alumni
Recipients of the Arjuna Award
Asian Games medalists in field hockey
World Series Hockey players
Field hockey players at the 2002 Asian Games
Field hockey players from Punjab, India
Indian male field hockey players
Asian Games silver medalists for India
Medalists at the 2002 Asian Games
HC Klein Zwitserland players
2006 Men's Hockey World Cup players